The 1936 Giro d'Italia was the 24th edition of the Giro d'Italia, organized and sponsored by the newspaper La Gazzetta dello Sport. The race was won by Gino Bartali of the Legnano team, with fellow Italians Giuseppe Olmo and Severino Canavesi coming in second and third respectively.

Participants

Of the 89 riders that began the Giro d'Italia on 16 May, 45 of them made it to the finish in Rome on 7 June. Riders were allowed to ride on their own or as a member of a team; 46 riders competed as part of a team, while the remaining 44 competed independently. The seven teams that partook in the race were: Bianchi, Dei, Fréjus, Ganna, Gloria, Legnano, and Maino.

The peloton was composed of only Italian riders due to the political situation involving Italy at the time. The field featured two former Giro d'Italia winners with Costante Girardengo who won the race in 1919 and 1923 and the returning champion Vasco Bergamaschi. Other notable Italian riders included Gino Bartali, Giovanni Valetti, and Giuseppe Olmo.

Route and stages

Classification leadership

The leader of the general classification – calculated by adding the stage finish times of each rider – wore a pink jersey. This classification is the most important of the race, and its winner is considered as the winner of the Giro.

The highest ranked isolati cyclist in the general classification were tracked.

In the mountains classification, the race organizers selected different mountains that the route crossed and awarded points to the riders who crossed them first.

The winner of the team classification was determined by adding the finish times of the best three cyclists per team together and the team with the lowest total time was the winner. If a team had fewer than three riders finish, they were not eligible for the classification.

The rows in the following table correspond to the jerseys awarded after that stage was run.

Final standings

General classification

Isolati classification

Mountains classification

Team classification

References

Notes

Citations

G
Giro d'Italia
Giro d'Italia by year
Giro d'Italia
Giro d'Italia